Very Bad Things is a 1998 American black comedy film written and directed by Peter Berg in his feature film directorial debut and starring Cameron Diaz, Jon Favreau, Daniel Stern, Jeremy Piven, Christian Slater, Leland Orser, Kobe Tai and Jeanne Tripplehorn.

Plot 
Kyle Fisher organizes a bachelor party in a Las Vegas hotel with his friends: Charles, Robert, and brothers Adam and Michael. Tina, a stripper/prostitute, is accidentally killed by Michael in the bathroom. Soon after, a security guard comes to investigate the ruckus and discovers Tina's corpse. In desperation, Robert stabs the guard to death. He then convinces the group to dismember the bodies, bury them in the desert, and never speak of it again.

At the rehearsal dinner, Adam cracks under the pressure from guilt, leading to a confrontation with Michael outside, with Adam threatening to turn him over to the police. Michael is convinced to leave, however while leaving, he turns to ram Adam's beloved minivan. Adam runs in front of his van and is crushed in the collision. In the hospital, Adam whispers something to his wife Lois before dying, as Robert looks on through a glass window.

Lois demands answers about what happened in Las Vegas when she finds a written confession by Adam. Kyle makes up a story about Adam sleeping with a prostitute. Robert, suspecting she does not believe them, kills Lois, later framing Michael by luring him to Lois' house, where he kills him. He concocts a story about a Michael/Lois/Adam love triangle to answer any interrogation by police. After these events and being named beneficiary of Adam and Lois' estate, Kyle breaks down and confesses the story to his fiancée Laura, who demands that her dream wedding proceed as planned.

On the wedding day, Robert confronts Kyle, demanding the money from Adam's life insurance policy. He refuses and a fight ensues which ends with Laura bludgeoning Robert.  During the ceremony, Kyle and Charles realize that Robert has the wedding rings. Charles goes to retrieve them, opening a door that knocks Robert down a stairwell where he dies. Laura demands Kyle bury his body in the desert and then ensure no loose ends remain by killing Charles. Ultimately, he cannot go through with it and as he drives home, he crashes into an oncoming car.

After the collision, Kyle's legs are amputated below the knee and Charles is a quadriplegic confined to a motorized wheelchair, leaving Laura to care for both of them, in addition to raising Adam and Lois's sons. As Laura watches Kyle with the two boys, it hits her that her life and dreams are totally ruined and has a nervous breakdown as she runs out of the house and collapses screaming in the street.

Cast
 Christian Slater as Robert Boyd
 Cameron Diaz as Laura Garrety-Fisher
 Jon Favreau as Kyle Fisher
 Daniel Stern as Adam Berkow
 Jeremy Piven as Michael Berkow
 Leland Orser as Charles Moore
 Jeanne Tripplehorn as Lois Berkow
 Joey Zimmerman as Adam Berkow Jr.
 Kobe Tai as Tina

Production
Very Bad Things was noted for having a very similar plot setup to Stag, a film which originally aired on HBO in June 1997. Director Peter Berg told The A.V. Club in 1998, "See, the first time I'd ever heard about Stag was after I had finished writing the screenplay for Very Bad Things. When we were at the point of getting the film financed, we had a lawyer look over the script and the film to make sure there weren't too many similarities. I mean, there were things we had to change; for example, one of the characters in the movie was a baker, and there was also a baker in our script, so we had to change some very minor things. But as far as I understand it, the two films take very different approaches to the material. I will say this: I think it would be interesting to get, like, three different directors—say, Soderbergh, Spielberg, and Coppola—and have them all tell the exact same story in a different way."

Reception
On Rotten Tomatoes the film has an approval rating of 41% based on reviews from 58 critics, with the consensus, "Mean-spirited and empty". On Metacritic it has a score of 31% based on reviews from 24 critics, indicating "generally unfavorable reviews". Audiences polled by CinemaScore gave the film a grade of "D+" on scale of A to F.

Roger Ebert wrote that Very Bad Things is "not a bad movie, just a reprehensible one". Some critics appreciated the cold-blooded approach. Maitland McDonagh of TV Guide wrote, "In a world filled with crude movie sitcoms, Berg's bitter, worst-possible-case scenario really does stand alone".

Some critics have viewed the film more favorably in the years since its release. In a retrospective for Daily Grindhouse, Preston Fassel praised the film as a critique of bro culture, writing "it’s the perfect deconstruction of the responsibility-free bro-comedy, a movie that looks at the real-life consequences of so much 'innocent' bad behavior," comparing its philosophy to the "Homer's Enemy" episode of The Simpsons and calling it "the brilliant anti-comedy we need today."

See also
 List of films set in Las Vegas

References

External links
 
 
 

1998 films
1998 comedy films
1998 directorial debut films
1990s black comedy films
1990s crime comedy films
American black comedy films
American crime comedy films
Crimes against sex workers in fiction
1990s English-language films
Films about murderers
Films about prostitution in the United States
Films about weddings in the United States
Films directed by Peter Berg
Films scored by Stewart Copeland
Films set in the Las Vegas Valley
Films with screenplays by Peter Berg
Initial Entertainment Group films
Interscope Communications films
Necrophilia in film
PolyGram Filmed Entertainment films
1990s American films